Blio may refer to:

Blio, an ebook reading software program
BLiO, an abbreviation of the chemical lithium boron monoxide (see article Dictionary of chemical formulas/Merge/B)
Berlin-Lichterfelde Ost railway station (BLIO), a railway station in Berlin, Germany.